Gogov (Bulgarian, Macedonian, Russian or Serbian Cyrillic: Гогов) is a Bulgarian masculine surname, its feminine counterpart is Gogova. It may refer to
Đorđe Gogov (born 1988), Serbian singer, musician, and television personality
Mihail Gogov (1912–1999), Archbishop of Ohrid and Macedonia
Snejina Gogova (born 1937), Bulgarian Sinologist, sociolinguist and psycholinguist
Tanya Gogova (born 1950), Bulgarian volleyball player 

Bulgarian-language surnames